Lieutenant General Ravendra Pal Singh PVSM, AVSM, VSM is a former General Officer Commanding-in-Chief (GOC-in-C) Western Command of the Indian Army. He assumed office on 1 August 2019, succeeding Gen Surinder Singh

Early life and education 
Gen Singh was commissioned into the Mechanised Infantry Regiment on 12 Jun 1982. An alumnus of National Defence Academy and Indian Military Academy, the General officer has attended the Defence Services Staff College, Senior Command Course, Higher Command Course and the National Defence College.

Career 
The general officer has held various regimental, staff and instructional appointments. These include brigade major of an Infantry Brigade in intense Counter Insurgency areas in J&K, GSO-2, Military Intelligence Directorate at IHQ of MoD (Army), Col GS (Military Doctrine) at Army War College, Mhow, BGS (Ops) of a command in the Western Theatre, ADG (Discipline & Vigilance), DG LWE & DG DC&W at IHQ of MoD (Army). He was instructor at School of Armoured Warfare Ahmednagar and was also posted as United Nations military observer in United Nations in Africa.

The general officer commanded a Mechanised Infantry Battalion, an Armoured Brigade and an Infantry Division in the Western Theatre.

He was also 'the colonel' of The Mechanised Infantry Regiment.

Military awards and aecorations
He is a recipient of Param Vishisht Seva Medal, Ati Vishisht Seva Medal, and Vishisht Seva Medal for distinguished service.

Dates of rank

References 

Indian generals
Living people
National Defence Academy (India) alumni
Year of birth missing (living people)
Recipients of the Param Vishisht Seva Medal
Recipients of the Ati Vishisht Seva Medal
Recipients of the Vishisht Seva Medal
Defence Services Staff College alumni
National Defence College, India alumni